Såta is a mountain  in Hemsedal municipality of Buskerud, in southern Norway.

Hemsedal
Mountains of Viken